David Sánchez Camacho (born 20 October 1963) is a Mexican politician from Mexico City.

A member of the Party of the Democratic Revolution (PRD) Sánchez serves as deputy in the Mexican Chamber of Deputies to which he was elected in 2006.  He had previously been a member of the Legislative Assembly of the Federal District.

Sánchez is one of the few openly gay politicians in México.

See also
List of the first openly LGBT holders of political offices#Mexico

References

1963 births
Living people
Gay politicians
Mexican LGBT politicians
Mexican LGBT rights activists
Members of the Chamber of Deputies (Mexico)
Party of the Democratic Revolution politicians
Politicians from Mexico City
Members of the Congress of Mexico City
21st-century Mexican politicians
LGBT legislators
21st-century Mexican LGBT people